Zlatko Manojlović (Serbian Cyrillic: Златко Манојловић; born 1951) is a Serbian guitarist and singer. He is known as the leader of the progressive rock band Dah and the heavy metal band Gordi, as well as for his eclectic solo work.

Career

Early career (early 1960s – 1972)
Manojlović started his musical career when he was very young. He was only fifteen when his composition won the first place in Radio Belgrade show Studio VI vam pruža šansu (Studio VI Gives You a Chance).

In 1969, Branislav Marušić "Čutura" invited him to join the reformed Džentlmeni. After Džentlmeni disbanded in 1972, he formed the short-lived band Fleš (Flash).

Dah (1972–76)

In 1972, Manojlović, together with Marušić, formed the band progressive rock Dah. The band released the album Veliki cirkus (The Big Circus) before moving to Belgium, where they changed their name to Land, and released the album Cool Breeze. The band returned to Yugoslavia in 1976 and, under the name Dah, released their third album, Povratak (The Return). Soon after, Dah disbanded.

Gordi (1977–84)

In 1977, Manojlović formed the band Gordi. After releasing three progreesive/hard rock-oriented albums, Čovek (A Man, 1978), Gordi 2 (1979) and Gordi 3 (1979), Gordi made a shift towards heavy metal with the album Pakleni trio (Hell Trio, 1981). After releasing the album Kraljica smrti (Queen of Death, 1982), Gordi disbanded in 1984.

Solo career (1975–present)
Manojlović started his solo career in 1975, while he was the leader of Dah, with the 7-inch single featuring the songs "Ko te sada ljubi" ("Who Kisses You Now") and "Osećanja" ("Feelings"). In 1977, while serving the Yugoslav People's Army in Ljubljana, he recorded the double seven " single entitled Ona je (She Is), featuring the instrumental "Jednoj ženi" ("To a Woman"), which became a hit. On the recording of the single he played both guitar and bass guitar, and Dare Petrič (guitar), Vlado Špindler (bass guitar), Andrej Petkovič (drums), Andrej Konjajev (keyboards) and Žare Prinčić (keyboards) also took part in the single recording.

Manojlović released his debut album Zlatko i njegove gitare (Zlatko and His Guitars) in 1980, while still leading Gordi. The album featured eight instrumentals composed by Manojlović and a version of Django Reinhardt's composition "Nuages". His own instrumentals varied from Latin music, over Balkan folk-inspired themes, to funk. In 1983, he released the album Jednoj ženi, on which he was accompanied by former Smak members Dragan Stojanović "Kepa" (drums) and Zoran Milanović (bass guitar). The album gained attention of the representatives of Toshiba EMI at the 1983 MIDEM, and the label released the album in Japan, but in the other countries as well.

In 1984, he left Yugoslavia and went abroad, participating in the recording of about fifty albums, although remaining mostly uncredited. In 1986, the English language album Zlatko was released in Yugoslavia. In 1994, the album Blue Heart was released in Germany. The album Zlatko, released in Serbia in 1995, featured, beside his own songs (including a new version of the title track), covers of The Beatles' "Strawberry Fields Forever", Chick Corea's "Spain", Mason Williams's "Classical Gas", Frank Sinatra's "My Way", Bonnie Tyler's "The Best" 10cc's "I'm Not in Love", and Derek and the Dominos' "Layla". Five tracks on the album were recorded with Munich Symphony Orchestra.

In 1997, he released his latest album Zlatko.

Vox (1996–98)
In 1996, Manojlović and his wife Izolda Barudžija, under the name Vox, released the album of the same title. Manojlović wrote the music, while the lyrics were written by both of them. In 1998, they released the album Vox, with some songs on it featuring Manojlović playing sitar.<ref>[http://www.discogs.com/Vox-Izolda-I-Zlatko/release/1802443 Da li znašćć at Discogs]</ref>

Collaborations
Manojlović appeared as guest on Opus' 1975 album Opus 1, Oko's 1976 album Raskorak (Gap) and Kozmetika's 1983 self-titled album.

He played guitar on Eros Ramazzotti's 1988 album Musica è (Music Is).

Production
Beside all the albums by Gordi and most of his solo releases, Manojlović has also produced Galija album Druga plovidba (1980) and Ruž album Nº 4 (1993), also authoring most of the latter.

Discography

With Dah

Studio albumsVeliki cirkus (1974)Cool Breeze (as Land, 1975)Povratak (1976)

Singles
"Ako poželiš" / "Noćna buka" (1973)
"Samo jedna noć" / "Cvrčak" (1973)
"Gitareska" / "Ti si ta" (1974)
"Mali princ" / "Ime" (1974)
"Šošana" / "Please, Don't Say Nothing" (as Land, 1975)
"Žeđ" / "Misli" (1976)
"Tomorrow" / "Under The Sky" (1977)

With Gordi

Studio albumsČovek (1978)Gordi 2 (1979)Gordi 3 (1979)Pakleni trio (1981)Kraljica smrti (1982)

Singles
"Duga noć" / "Idi sad" (1978)

Solo

Studio albumsZlatko i njegove gitare (1980)Zlatko (1982)Jednoj ženi (1983)Zlatko (1986)Blue Heart (1994)Zlatko (1995)Zlatko (1997)

Singles
"Ko te sada ljubi" / "Osećanja" (1975)Ona je (double 7-inch, 1977)
"Tvoja pesma" / "U sumrak" (1978)

With Vox

Studio albumsVox (1996)Vox (1998)

 References 

 EX YU ROCK enciklopedija 1960–2006'', Janjatović Petar;

External links
Zlatko Manojlović at Discogs

1951 births
Living people
Serbian rock singers
Serbian rock guitarists
Serbian heavy metal musicians
Serbian singer-songwriters
Serbian record producers
Yugoslav rock singers
Yugoslav musicians